In statistical mechanics, the Temperley–Lieb algebra is an algebra from which are built certain transfer matrices, invented by Neville Temperley and Elliott Lieb. It is also related to  integrable models, knot theory and the braid group, quantum groups and subfactors of von Neumann algebras.

Structure

Generators and relations
Let  be a commutative ring and fix . The Temperley–Lieb algebra  is the -algebra generated by the elements , subject to the Jones relations: 
 for all 
 for all 
 for all 
 for all  such that 
Using these relations, any product of generators  can be brought to Jones' normal form:

Elements of this type form a basis of the Temperley-Lieb algebra.

The dimensions of Temperley-Lieb algebras are Catalan numbers: 

The Temperley–Lieb algebra  is a subalgebra of the Brauer algebra , and therefore also of the partition algebra . The Temperley–Lieb algebra  is semisimple for  where  is a known, finite set. For a given , all semisimple Temperley-Lieb algebras are isomorphic.

Diagram algebra
 may be represented diagrammatically as the vector space over noncrossing pairings of  points on two opposite sides of a rectangle with n points on each of the two sides.

The identity element is the diagram in which each point is connected to the one directly across the rectangle from it. The generator  is the diagram in which the -th and -th point on the left side are connected to each other, similarly the two points opposite to these on the right side, and all other points are connected to the point directly across the rectangle.

Multiplication on basis elements can be performed by concatenation: placing two rectangles side by side, and replacing any closed loops by a factor , for example :

  ×    =    =    .

The Jones relations can be seen graphically:

   =    

    =  

   =   

.

Representations

Structure

The dimension of a simple module is written in terms of binomial coefficients as

A basis of the simple module  is the set  of monic noncrossing pairings from  points on the left to  points on the right. (Monic means that each point on the right is connected to a point on the left.)

(Concatenation can produce non-monic pairings, which have to be modded out.) The module  may be called a standard module or link module.

If  with  a root of unity,  may not be semisimple, and  may not be irreducible:

If  is reducible, then its quotient by its maximal proper submodule is irreducible.

Branching rules from the Brauer algebra

Simple modules of the Brauer algebra  can be decomposed into simple modules of the Temperley-Lieb algebra. The decomposition is called a branching rule, and it is a direct sum with positive integer coefficients:

where  is the number of standard Young tableaux of shape , given by the hook length formula.

Affine Temperley-Lieb algebra

The affine Temperley-Lieb algebra  is an infinite-dimensional algebra such that . It is obtained by adding generators  such that
  for all ,
 ,
 .
The indices are supposed to be periodic i.e. , and the Temperley-Lieb relations are supposed to hold for all . Then  is central. A finite-dimensional quotient of the algebra , sometimes called the unoriented Jones-Temperley-Lieb algebra, is obtained by
assuming , and replacing non-contractible lines with the same factor  as contractible lines (for example, in the case , this implies ).

The algebra  is infinite-dimensional because lines can wind around the cylinder. If  is even, there can even exist closed winding lines, which are non-contractible. 

The Temperley-Lieb algebra is a quotient of the corresponding affine Temperley-Lieb algebra.

Cell modules are finite-dimensional, with 

The cell module  is irreducible for all , where the set  is countable. For  ,  has an irreducible quotient. Cell modules of the unoriented Jones-Temperley-Lieb algebra must obey  if , and  if .

Applications

Temperley–Lieb Hamiltonian

Consider an interaction-round-a-face model e.g. a square lattice model and let  be the number of sites on the lattice. Following Temperley and Lieb we define the Temperley–Lieb Hamiltonian (the TL Hamiltonian) as

In what follows we consider the special case .

We will firstly consider the case .

  =  2    -    -  .

We have two possible states,

   =  2    -    -    =    -  ,

and

   =  2    -    -    =  -    +  .

Writing  as a matrix in the basis of possible states we have,

As we vary the number of sites  we find the following table

where we have used the notation  -times e.g., .

An interesting observation is that the largest components of the ground state of  have a combinatorial enumeration as we vary the number of sites, as was first observed by Murray Batchelor, Jan de Gier and Bernard Nienhuis. Using the resources of the on-line encyclopedia of integer sequences, Batchelor et al. found, for an even numbers of sites

and for an odd numbers of sites

Surprisingly, these sequences corresponded to well known combinatorial objects. For  even, this  corresponds to cyclically symmetric transpose complement plane partitions and for  odd, these correspond to alternating sign matrices symmetric about the vertical axis.

XXZ spin chain

References

Further reading

Von Neumann algebras
Algebra
Knot theory
Braids
Diagram algebras